1970 Preparatory Meeting of the Non-Alignment Countries which took place on 13–17 April in Dar es Salaam, Tanzania was the first one of the three preparatory meetings (the second one subsequently taking place in New Delhi in June 1970 and the third one in Lusaka in July 1970) ahead of the 3rd Summit of the Non-Aligned Movement in Lusaka, Zambia later that year. The meeting in Dar es Salaam was tasked with the selection of the host country for the next summit as multiple member states expressed their interest. At the meeting in Dar es Salaam countries formally interested in hosting the event were Ethiopia, India, Morocco and Algeria. Arab countries pressured Ethiopia to drop its application, after which Addis Ababa strongly advocated for Zambia which received 29, while Algeria received 23 votes. The host country of the meeting and the President of Tanzania Julius Nyerere used the opportunity to underline that if the concept of nonalignment is to retain its relevance then it must include explicit and clear economic aspect of cooperation.

See also
 Foreign relations of Tanzania

References

Preparatory Meeting
Foreign relations of Tanzania
Dar es Salaam
1970 conferences
1970 in politics
1970 in Tanzania